Reginald Parker, sometimes erroneously cited as Richard Parker, was an English footballer who played in the Football League for Brentford, South Shields and Merthyr Town as a forward.

Career
After beginning his career in the northeast with Boldon Comrades, Parker joined Third Division South club Brentford during the 1922 off-season. After a slow start at inside forward, he came to prominence during the 1923–24 season, scoring 20 goals in 43 games and finishing as the team's top scorer. After switching to centre forward, Parker could muster only 9 goals in 42 appearances during the 1924–25 season. After scoring 35 goals in 104 appearances, Parker departed the Bees to join Second Division club South Shields. Parker was top scorer for the team during the 1926–27 season and scored 41 league goals in three seasons with the club. He moved on to spend the 1928–29 season with Third Division South club Merthyr Town, before ending his career with Southern League club Tunbridge Wells Rangers.

Career statistics

References

1902 births
Year of death missing
People from Willington Quay
Footballers from Tyne and Wear
English footballers
Association football inside forwards
Brentford F.C. players
South Shields F.C. (1889) players
Merthyr Town F.C. players
Tunbridge Wells F.C. players
English Football League players
Southern Football League players